2123 Vltava, provisional designation , is a stony Koronian asteroid from the outer region of the asteroid belt, approximately 15 kilometers in diameter. It was discovered on 22 September 1973, by Soviet–Russian astronomer Nikolai Chernykh at the Crimean Astrophysical Observatory on the Crimean peninsula in Nauchnyj. It is named for the river Vltava (Moldau).

Classification and orbit 

The S-type asteroid is a member of the Koronis family, which is named after 158 Koronis and consists of about 300 known bodies with nearly co-planar ecliptical orbits. The asteroid orbits the Sun in the outer main-belt at a distance of 2.6–3.1 AU once every 4 years and 10 months (1,767 days). Its orbit has an eccentricity of 0.08 and an inclination of 1° with respect to the ecliptic. A first precovery taken at Heidelberg in 1934, extends the body's observation arc by 39 years prior to its official discovery observation at Nauchnyj.

Physical characteristics

Rotation period 

For Vltava, the survey gave an ambiguous rotation period of 34.0 hours with a brightness variation of 0.21 in magnitude. In 2014, photometric observations at the Palomar Transient Factory in California rendered a lightcurve with an alternative solution of  hours, or about half the period previously found, with an amplitude of 0.19 magnitude.

Diameter and albedo 

According to the surveys carried out by the international Infrared Astronomical Satellite (IRAS), the Japanese Akari satellite, and the NEOWISE mission of NASA's Wide-field Infrared Survey Explorer, the asteroid measures between 14.4 and 15.1 kilometers in diameter and its surface has an albedo between 0.20 and 0.22.

Naming 

This minor planet was named for the Vltava (Moldau), the longest river within the Czech Republic, running through the city of Prague. The approved naming citation was published by the Minor Planet Center on 1 April 1980.

References

External links 
 Asteroid Lightcurve Database (LCDB), query form (info )
 Dictionary of Minor Planet Names, Google books
 Asteroids and comets rotation curves, CdR – Observatoire de Genève, Raoul Behrend
 Discovery Circumstances: Numbered Minor Planets (1)-(5000) – Minor Planet Center
 
 

002123
Discoveries by Nikolai Chernykh
Named minor planets
19730922